Hotel is a 1967 American Technicolor drama film, an adaptation of Arthur Hailey's 1965 novel of the same name. The film stars Rod Taylor, Catherine Spaak, Karl Malden, Kevin McCarthy, Michael Rennie, Merle Oberon, and Melvyn Douglas. It is directed by Richard Quine.

Plot
The story takes place at the fictional St Gregory Hotel in New Orleans, owned by Warren Trent.

The hotel is in financial trouble. Hotel manager Peter McDermott involves himself in the proposals from three potential buyers of the property. He also takes a romantic interest in Jeanne Rochefort, the beautiful French mistress of one of the bidders, and deals with a wide range of routine problems, including a faulty elevator.

Jeanne is the mistress of Curtis O'Keefe, who intends to renovate and "modernize" the hotel, with conveyor belts carrying luggage automatically around the building as if it were some sort of modern airport terminal, and even presenting the customer's bill on a conveyor belt. While this is O'Keefe's vision for a hotel of the future, his immediate plans for the St. Gregory are different: He would remove the fountain in the center of the lobby and replace it with a circular news stand and bookstore; he would remove the comfortable lobby seating, forcing guests to go to a restaurant or lounge and spend money to sit; he would change the mezzanine promenade with rows of little shops; and he would chop up the great suites into smaller guest rooms.

Among the guests at the hotel are the Duke and Duchess of Lanbourne, a wealthy couple hiding out after fleeing from an accident in their car. A hotel detective, Dupere, attempts to blackmail the Duke and Duchess. The Duchess responds by asking Dupere to drive the car from the accident to Washington D.C. for $25,000 ($ today), but he gets caught outside of the city.

Keycase, a professional thief, is working the hotel using a range of techniques and some female accomplices. In the beginning of the film he picks up a discarded key found in an ashtray at the airport. During the course of the film he sneaks into hotel rooms and steals the guests' money, but now that they can buy things by credit card, he finds that most of the guests carry very little cash.

Meanwhile, a black couple, Dr. Elmo Adams and his wife, attempt to rent a room at the St. Gregory, having previously made a reservation. However, Trent tells the assistant manager filling in for McDermott (McDermott having been offered a sexual liaison with Jeanne at his French Quarter apartment) not to allow them accommodation. The Adamses are denied their room, the couple then disappear only to be followed by a man with a camera. When McDermott finds out, he berates Trent for doing something that would jeopardize the preferred bid, from a union that will maintain the style – and jobs – of the St. Gregory. After tracking them down to another hotel, McDermott offers the couple their room back, but when he goes to pick them up, they have already left the hotel.  After contacting the NAACP, they inform McDermott that they had not had anything planned (yet) for the St. Gregory in terms of pushing to allow blacks to check into the hotel. The couple then winds up in a Washington newspaper, damaging both O'Keefe's deal and the alternate deal with the union, leaving only the option of selling the hotel to a buyer who plans to destroy it and build an office tower.

O'Keefe makes a final offer on the hotel and asks Trent, who brings McDermott along, to hear it. During the meeting, McDermott gets a call revealing that "Dr." Elmo Adams is not a doctor after all and actually works as an employee for an O'Keefe Hotel in Philadelphia.  McDermott also reveals that O'Keefe offered him $20,000 ($ today) to convince Trent to take the deal, and implies that Rochefort slept with him so that he wouldn't be at the hotel to properly handle the arrival of the black guests. Hotel owner Trent decides to reject the unscrupulous O'Keefe's offer and sell the St. Gregory to the man who will demolish it.

Keycase's luck changes when he blithely talks himself out of one tough spot in the suite of the Duke and Duchess by grabbing an ordinary-looking attaché case. He gets to a room, calms his pounding heart, and uses one of his key collection to open the case to see what it contains. The case is filled with the cash to pay off Dupere. Counting himself lucky, Keycase heads for the elevator to leave.
 
In the elevator, Keycase is joined by the Duke and other guests.  The elevator stops between floors as the control relays and emergency brakes begin to fail. McDermott and his assistant manager take the adjacent elevator to the same level and transfer passengers through the roof.  The Duke and Keycase are the last two in the failing car. Keycase refuses to leave his briefcase, which contains the stolen money.  The Duke is able to wrestle the case away and help Keycase out of the car, but right then the brakes completely fail, sending the Duke to his death.

The Duchess tells police she was responsible for the auto accident, hoping to save her late husband's reputation. She also saves Dupere by confirming his story that he was unaware that the car had been involved in the hit-and-run accident when she hired him to drive it to Washington, D.C. for $300 ($ today). The police detectives, seeing through the ruse, decide not to press charges. Keycase is arrested after he is recognized in the wake of his rescue.

McDermott rounds up the remaining guests, including Jeanne, and buys drinks on the house as a final toast to the St. Gregory.

Cast
 Rod Taylor as Peter McDermott, manager 
 Catherine Spaak as Jeanne Rochefort, O'Keefe's mistress 
 Karl Malden as Keycase Milne, thief
 Melvyn Douglas as Warren Trent, owner
 Richard Conte as crooked house detective Dupere
 Merle Oberon as the Duchess Caroline
 Michael Rennie as the Duke of Lanbourne
 Kevin McCarthy as Curtis O'Keefe, bidder
 Carmen McRae as Christine, hotel chanteuse
 Alfred Ryder as Capt. Yolles
 Roy Roberts as Bailey
 Al Checco as Herbie Chandler
 Sheila Bromley as Mrs. Grandin
 Harry Hickox as Sam
 William Lanteau as Mason
 Ken Lynch as Joe Laswell, union bidder
 Clinton Sundberg as Lawrence Morgan
 Tol Avery as Kilbrick
 Davis Roberts as Dr. Elmo Adams
 Annazette Chase as Mrs. Adams (Uncredited)
 Napoleon Whiting as Waiter (Uncredited)
 Judy Norton as Daughter

Critical reception
Hotel has a 100% rating on Rotten Tomatoes based on six reviews. Variety called the film "a very well made, handsomely produced drama" and said that Spaak "is charming and sexy" in her U.S. film debut.

See also
 Hotel (novel)
 Hotel (U.S. TV series)
 List of American films of 1967

References

External links
 
 
 
 
 

1967 films
1967 drama films
American drama films
1960s English-language films
Films based on Canadian novels
Films directed by Richard Quine
Warner Bros. films
Films set in hotels
Films set in New Orleans
Films shot in New Orleans
Films with screenplays by Wendell Mayes
Films based on works by Arthur Hailey
1960s American films